Shahaji II (formerly Vikramsinhrao (Nana Sahib) Puar) (4 April 1910 – 9 May 1983) of the Bhonsle dynasty of the Marathas, was the Maharaja of Kolhapur between 1947 and 1949. He was the grandson of Shahu of Kolhapur through his daughter Radhabai and hence nephew of Rajaram III of Kolhapur.

He was the son of Maharaja Tukoji Rao III Puar of Dewas Senior. He was the Maharaja of Dewas Senior between 1937 and 1947, when he abdicated to become Maharaja of Kolhapur. He was the first Maharaja of Kolhapur to be adopted from the Puar dynasty.

As his only son Krishnajirao III had already succeeded him as the Maharaja of Dewas Senior in 1947 therefore, his grandson from eldest daughter Shaliniraje succeeded him as the titular Maharaja of Kolhapur in 1983 with regnal name Shahu II of Kolhapur.

See also

 Maratha Empire
 List of Maratha dynasties and states
 List of Indian princely states
 Krishnajirao III
 Tukojirao IV
 Vikram Singh Rao II Puar
 Dhar State

References

Maharajas of Kolhapur
1910 births
1983 deaths
Knights Grand Commander of the Order of the Star of India
People from Dewas
Indian knights
Monarchs who abdicated